Justicia pectoralis is an herb in the family Acanthaceae. This water-willow is widely known as tilo in Latin America and in Cuba. In Haiti it is called chapantye and zeb chapantyè on Dominica and Martinique. Other folk names are freshcut, chambá carpintero ("carpenter"), té criollo ("Criollo tea"), curia, death-angel, masha-hari, or "piri piri". This species was described by Nikolaus Joseph von Jacquin in 1760, who provided additional data in 1763. A well-marked variety, var. stenophylla, was described by Emery Clarence Leonard in 1958.

Uses

Traditional uses
Across its range it is used in folk medicine as a relaxant and general tonic. Additionally it is often used in ayahuasca.

Other uses
As regards other applications, it is noted for its pleasant smell and as a source of coumarin, which it produces in plenty, and which in combination with umbelliferone is responsible for many of its notable properties. It is also admixed to epená (Virola) snuff to make it smell more pleasant. In particular var. stenophylla might also be hallucinogenic in certain preparations; it is known to wajacas (shamans) of the Krahô tribe in Brazil, who know that variety as mashi-hiri and consider it a potent entheogen, not to be taken by the uninitiated. The wajacas (shamans) refer to the leaves of the Justicia pectoralis var. stenophylla as bolek-bena meaning "Leaves of the Angel of Death." Its name likely comes from the fact it has killed three curanderos.

Etymology
The name "tilo" could be by association with Tilia, the linden trees. These are entirely unrelated eudicots whose flowers have similar relaxant properties. The water-"willows" are not relatives of the true willows either; like the lindens, the latter belong to the rosid branch of the eudicots.

References

Bibliography

 [2003]: Tilo [in Spanish]. Retrieved 2008-11-01.
Tilo (in Spanish), Consultas Medicas. Retrieved June 2010.
 (2006a): Germplasm Resources Information Network – Justicia pectoralis. Version of 2006-08-04. Retrieved 2008-04-04.

pectoralis
Medicinal plants
Taxa named by Nikolaus Joseph von Jacquin